This list of museums in Vermont encompasses museums defined for this context as institutions (including nonprofit organizations, government entities, and private businesses) that collect and care for objects of cultural, artistic, scientific, or historical interest and make their collections or related exhibits available for public viewing. Museums that exist only in cyberspace (i.e., virtual museums) are not included.

For Wikipedia links to institutions similar to museums in Vermont, consult the "See also" section.

The list

Defunct museums
 Cornish Colony Museum, Windsor, closed about 2010
 National Museum of the Morgan Horse, Shelburne
 Precision Valley Corvette Museum, Springfield, formerly part of the Springfield Diner

See also
 Aquaria in Vermont (category)
 Nature Centers in Vermont

References

External links
 Vermont Museum and Gallery Alliance

 
Vermont
Museums
Museums